Sergeant York (formerly Allaboard Jules) is a horse owned by the United States Army. 

An American Standardbred, Sergeant York was foaled April 25, 1991 and reared as a racehorse in New York under the name Allaboard Jules. During his racing career, he won five of the 23 races in which he participated at tracks in New Jersey and New York. In 1997 Allaboard Jules entered military service and was renamed Sergeant York, in honor of Alvin York. He has, since that time, been posted to the Military District of Washington as part of the United States Army Caisson Platoon of the 3rd Infantry Regiment where he serves as a caparisoned horse. Sergeant York filled this role, among other occasions, at the state funeral of Ronald Reagan.

References

Ceremonial horses
Individual warhorses